The 2012–13 season of the Belgian Pro League (also known as Jupiler Pro League for sponsorship reasons) was the 110th season of top-tier football in Belgium. It started on 28 July 2012 with the first match of the regular season between Kortrijk and defending champions Anderlecht, and ended on 26 May 2013, which was the return leg of the European playoff.

During the regular season, Club Brugge took the early lead but then started struggling, eventually leading to the sacking of head coach Georges Leekens when they dropped out of the top 6 in November. Anderlecht and overachievers Zulte Waregem took over the top two positions and comfortably held these until the playoffs.

The title playoffs started with Anderlecht on 34 points and Zulte Waregem just behind them on 32. Due to the division of the points by two, they held a smaller lead over Genk (28 points), Club Brugge (27), Lokeren (26) and Standard (25). To the surprise of many, Zulte Waregem took the lead about halfway through the playoffs and with Anderlecht not performing well and suffering a penalty kick trauma (missing no less than 10 penalty kicks over the course of the season and going out on penalties to Genk in the Belgian Cup), both Genk, Club Brugge and Standard Liège rapidly close the gap. Anderlecht managed to overtake Zulte Waregem again and went into the final match on 19 May 2013, at home against Zulte Waregem, with a two-point lead. Anderlecht equalized after going down 0-1 and under pressure managed to hold on, even though losing Cheikhou Kouyaté due to a red card. With that, Anderlecht won its 32nd title.
The draw allowed Zulte Waregem to remain just in front of Club Brugge, thereby gaining access to the Champions League. Club Brugge and Genk qualified for the Europa League, due to finishing 3rd and winning the Cup respectively.

The Europa League playoff groups were won by Gent and Oud-Heverlee Leuven, with Gent easily beating OH Leuven for the overall win. Gent had played a disappointing season, initially aiming for the top 6 but eventually finishing 12th. By winning the Europa League playoff, they won the right to play against Standard Liège for the final Europa League ticket. Gent won the first match 1-0 but lost the return 7–0, allowing Standard to take the last European ticket.

In the bottom end of the table, Cercle Brugge faced a miserable season after finishing 7th the previous season, as now only three wins and five draws out of thirty matches caused them to end dead last. Lierse narrowly held of Beerschot, causing Cercle Brugge and Beerschot to play the relegation playoff. Beerschot initially extended their lead, but Cercle Brugge came back and on 20 April 2013, a 2–1 win by Cercle caused Beerschot to be relegated. Beerschot had been playing in the top division since 1989–90, initially as Germinal Ekeren, then as Germinal Beerschot. A few days after the relegation it was announced that Beerschot was in severe financial trouble and was not given a licence for professional football. On 21 May, Beerschot was officially declared bankrupt and dissolved as a whole. Cercle Brugge on the other hand, had to play the Belgian Second Division Final Round with second division teams Mouscron-Péruwelz, Westerlo and WS Woluwe. On 23 May 2013, Cercle Brugge became the first team succeeding in avoiding relegation after playing the relegation playoff, since the installation of the playoffs system in 2009–10.

Teams
Following the 2011–12 Belgian Pro League, Sint-Truiden were relegated to the 2012–13 Belgian Second Division after losing their relegation playoff series against Westerlo, ending a three-season tenure in the league. Sint-Truiden were replaced by 2011–12 Second Division champions Charleroi, who made their immediate comeback to the highest Belgian football league. In the 2012 Belgian Second Division Final Round, Westerlo faced Second Division teams Eupen, Oostende and Waasland-Beveren. On 17 May 2012, Westerlo were relegated after a 0–0 draw away to Oostende. Also in Oostende, Waasland-Beveren secured the promotion one week later after a 1–1 draw.

Stadia and locations

Managerial changes

Regular season

League table

Positions by round
Note: The classification was made after the weekend (or midweek) of each matchday, so postponed matches were only processed at the time they were played to represent the real evolution in standings.

The following matches were postponed during the season:
 Matchday 23: on 20 January both the match between leaders Anderlecht and second placed Zulte Waregem and the Bruges derby between Club Brugge and Cercle Brugge were postponed due to intensive snowing. They have been rescheduled to be played end of February between matchdays 28 and 29.
 Matchday 24: also due to snow, the match between Charleroi and Cercle Brugge was postponed on 26 January. The match was played on 20 February, between matchdays 27 and 28.
 Matchday 28: yet again it was snow that prevented a match to be played. The fixture between Charleroi and Zulte Waregem was postponed on 24 February and rescheduled to 3 March, between matchdays 28 and 29.

Results

Championship playoff
The points obtained during the regular season were halved (and rounded up) before the start of the playoff. As a result, the teams started with the following points before the playoff: Anderlecht 34 points, Zulte Waregem 32, Genk 28, Club Brugge 27, Lokeren 26 and Standard 25. In the event of ties at the end of the playoffs, the half point will be deducted if it was added. Anderlecht, Genk, Lokeren and Zulte Waregem received this type of bonus due to rounding and will thus always be ranked below Club Brugge and Standard in the event of ties.

Playoff table

Positions by round
Below the positions per round are shown. As teams did not all start with an equal number of points, the initial pre-playoffs positions are also given.

Results

Europa League Playoff
Group A contains the teams finishing the regular season in positions 7, 9, 12 and 14. The teams finishing in positions 8, 10, 11 and 13 are placed in Group B.

Group A

Group B

Europa League playoff final
The winners of both playoff groups will compete in a two-legged match to play the fourth-placed team of the championship playoff, called Testmatch. The winners of this Testmatch are granted entry to the second qualifying round of the 2012–13 UEFA Europa League.

Gent won 8–2 on aggregate.

Testmatches Europa League
The Europa League playoff final winners will compete with the fourth placed team (or fifth placed in case the winner of the 2012–13 Belgian Cup finishes third or fourth) in the Championship playoff for the final European ticket.

Standard Liège won 7–1 on aggregate.

Relegation playoff
Beerschot and Cercle Brugge, the teams finishing in the last two positions, faced each other in the relegation playoff. Beerschot initially extended their three-point bonus to a six-point lead, but thereafter Cercle Brugge won three matches in a row. This caused Beerschot to be relegated to the Second Division on 20 April 2013 after playing in the first division since 1989 (as Germinal Ekeren until 1999 and as Germinal Beerschot from 1999 until 2011). One month later however, it was announced that Beerschot had gone bankrupt and dissolved.

Cercle Brugge was forced to play the second division playoff with three Belgian Second Division teams, which they won to avoid relegation. It was the first time a team from the Pro League succeeded in surviving the Second Division Final Round since the installment of the Belgian Pro League playoffs.

Season statistics
Source: Sporza.be and Sport.be

Top scorers

10 goals (2 players)

  Lior Refaelov (Club Brugge)
  Glynor Plet (Genk)

9 goals (6 players)

  Eiður Guðjohnsen (Club Brugge (3) & Cercle Brugge (6))
  Benjamin De Ceulaer (Genk (6) & Lokeren (3))
  Kostadin Hazurov (Lierse)
  Benjamin Mokulu (Lokeren)
  Aloys Nong (Mons)
  Paul-Jose M'Poku (Standard Liège)

8 goals (5 players)

  Milan Jovanović (Anderlecht)
  Chuka (OH Leuven)
  Karel Geraerts (OH Leuven)
  Yoni Buyens (Standard Liège)
  Barak Badash (Waasland-Beveren)

7 goals (8 players)

  Massimo Bruno (Anderlecht)
  Sacha Iakovenko (Anderlecht)
  Mushaga Bakenga (Cercle Brugge)
  Julien Gorius (Genk)
  Pablo Chavarría (Kortrijk)
  Rachid Bourabia (Lierse)
  Mijat Marić (Lokeren)
  Ayanda Patosi (Lokeren)

6 goals (10 players)

  Guillaume Gillet (Anderlecht)
  David Pollet (Charleroi)
  Giuseppe Rossini (Charleroi)
  Elyaniv Barda (Genk)
  Christophe Lepoint (Gent (1) & Waasland-Beveren (5))
  Miloš Marić (Lokeren)
  Koen Persoons (Lokeren)
  Nacho González (Standard Liège)
  Habib Habibou (Zulte Waregem)
  Jens Naessens (Zulte Waregem)

5 goals (15 players)

  Lucas Biglia (Anderlecht)
  Hernán Losada (Beerschot)
  Benito Raman (Beerschot)
  Vadis Odjidja-Ofoe (Club Brugge)
  Mohammed Tchité (Club Brugge)
  Steeven Joseph-Monrose (Genk)
  Elimane Coulibaly (Gent (2) & Beerschot (3))
  Mustapha Oussalah (Kortrijk)
  Ervin Zukanović (Kortrijk)
  Mohamed El-Gabbas (Lierse)
  Nill De Pauw (Lokeren)
  Abdul-Yakuni Iddi (Mechelen)
  Mads Junker (Mechelen)
  Shlomi Arbeitman (Mons (3) & Gent (2))
  Christian Pouga (OH Leuven)

4 goals (20 players)

  Kanu (Anderlecht)
  Onur Kaya (Charleroi)
  Ryan Donk (Club Brugge)
  Thomas Meunier (Club Brugge)
  Thomas Buffel (Genk)
  Hervé Kage (Gent (3) & Charleroi (1))
  Ernest Nfor (Kortrijk)
  Jérémy Taravel (Lokeren)
  Boubacar Dialiba (Mechelen)
  Steven De Petter (Mechelen)
  David Destorme (Mechelen)
  Seth de Witte (Mechelen)
  Thomas Enevoldsen (Mechelen)
  Robin Henkens (Mechelen)
  Frédéric Bulot (Standard Liège)
  William Vainqueur (Standard Liège)
  Stijn De Smet (Waasland-Beveren)
  Jordan Remacle (Waasland-Beveren (2) & Gent (2))
  Davy De fauw (Zulte Waregem)
  Thorgan Hazard (Zulte Waregem)

3 goals (24 players)

  Sacha Kljestan (Anderlecht)
  Matías Suárez (Anderlecht)
  Roei Dayan (Beerschot)
  Dalibor Veselinović (Beerschot)
  Rudy (Cercle Brugge)
  Lukas Van Eenoo (Cercle Brugge)
  Ziguy Badibanga (Charleroi)
  Danijel Milićević (Charleroi)
  Óscar Duarte (Club Brugge)
  Víctor Vázquez (Club Brugge)
  Björn Vleminckx (Club Brugge)
  Christian Benteke (Genk)
  Khaleem Hyland (Genk)
  Christian Brüls (Gent)
  Yaya Soumahoro (Gent)
  Brecht Dejaegere (Kortrijk)
  Stefan Mitrović (Kortrijk)
  Ivan Leko (Lokeren)
  Jérémy Sapina (Mons)
  Reza Ghoochannejhad (Standard Liège)
  Luis Seijas (Standard Liège)
  Jelle Van Damme (Standard Liège)
  Junior Malanda (Zulte Waregem)
  Aleksandar Trajkovski (Zulte Waregem)

2 goals (43 players)

  Olivier Deschacht (Anderlecht)
  Dennis Praet (Anderlecht)
  Ronald Vargas (Anderlecht)
  Maël Lépicier (Beerschot (1) & Mons (1))
  Joachim Mununga (Beerschot)
  Stijn Wuytens (Beerschot)
  William Carvalho (Cercle Brugge)
  Bernt Evens (Cercle Brugge)
  Gregory Mertens (Cercle Brugge)
  Tim Smolders (Cercle Brugge)
  Michael Uchebo (Cercle Brugge)
  Mohammed Aoulad (Charleroi)
  Mijuško Bojović (Charleroi)
  Harlem Gnohéré (Charleroi)
  Abraham Kumedor (Charleroi)
  Bennard Kumordzi (Genk)
  Kara Mbodj (Genk)
  Anele Ngcongca (Genk)
  César Arzo (Gent)
  Rodgers Kola (Gent)
  Jorge López (Gent)
  Mamoutou N'Diaye (Gent)
  Hannes van der Bruggen (Gent)
  Gertjan De Mets (Kortrijk)
  Nebojša Pavlović (Kortrijk)
  Dolly Menga (Lierse)
  Ahmed Okka (Lierse)
  Junior Dutra (Lokeren)
  Sheldon Bateau (Mechelen)
  Arnor Angeli (Mons)
  Tim Matthys (Mons)
  Zola Matumona (Mons)
  Tom Van Imschoot (Mons)
  Alessandro Cerigioni (OH Leuven)
  Stefán Gíslason (OH Leuven)
  Evariste Ngolok (OH Leuven)
  Bjorn Ruytinx (OH Leuven)
  Augusto Da Silva (Waasland-Beveren)
  Benoît Ladrière (Waasland-Beveren)
  Wesley Sonck (Waasland-Beveren)
  Ibrahima Conté (Zulte Waregem (1) & Gent (1))
  Jonathan Delaplace (Zulte Waregem)
  Ivan Lendrić (Zulte Waregem)

1 goal (82 players)

  Samuel Armenteros (Anderlecht)
  Demy de Zeeuw (Anderlecht)
  Cheikhou Kouyaté (Anderlecht)
  Bram Nuytinck (Anderlecht)
  Boldizsár Bodor (Beerschot)
  Frédéric Brillant (Beerschot)
  Wim De Decker (Beerschot)
  Guillaume François (Beerschot)
  Conor Laerenbergh (Beerschot)
  Marvin Ogunjimi (Beerschot)
  Funso Ojo (Beerschot)
  Alpaslan Öztürk (Beerschot)
  Joaquín Boghossian (Cercle Brugge)
  Frederik Boi (Cercle Brugge)
  Stephen Buyl (Cercle Brugge)
  Oleg Iachtchouk (Cercle Brugge)
  Anthony Portier (Cercle Brugge)
  Igor Vetokele (Cercle Brugge)
  Viktor Bopp (Charleroi)
  Elvedin Džinić (Charleroi)
  Jamal Thiaré (Charleroi)
  Jonathan Blondel (Club Brugge)
  Jesper Jørgensen (Club Brugge)
  Ivan Tričkovski (Club Brugge)
  Niki Zimling (Club Brugge)
  Kalidou Koulibaly (Genk)
  Anthony Limbombe (Genk)
  Kim Ojo (Genk)
  Jeroen Simaeys (Genk)
  Valery Nahayo (Gent)
  Bernd Thijs (Gent)
  Wallace (Gent)
  Brecht Capon (Kortrijk)
  Mario Carević (Kortrijk)
  Thomas Matton (Kortrijk)
  Landry Mulemo (Kortrijk)
  Ahmed Abou Moslem (Lierse)
  Jason Adesanya (Lierse)
  Soufiane Bidaoui (Lierse)
  Saladin Said (Lierse)
  Arjan Swinkels (Lierse)
  Julien Vercauteren (Lierse)
  Walter Fernández (Lokeren)
  Ibrahima Gueye (Lokeren)
  Enes Sağlık (Lokeren)
  Maxime Biset (Mechelen)
  Alessandro Cordaro (Mechelen)
  Joachim Van Damme (Mechelen)
  Wannes Van Tricht (Mechelen)
  Peter Franquart (Mons)
  Thomas Chatelle (Mons)
  Grégory Lorenzi (Mons)
  Pieterjan Monteyne (Mons)
  Benjamin Nicaise (Mons)
  Nicolas Timmermans (Mons)
  Thomas Azevedo (OH Leuven)
  Joren Dehond (OH Leuven)
  Ovidy Karuru (OH Leuven)
  Tomislav Mikulić (OH Leuven)
  Wim Raymaekers (OH Leuven)
  Robson (OH Leuven)
  Kenneth Van Goethem (OH Leuven)
  Koen Weuts (OH Leuven)
  Astrit Ajdarević (Standard Liège)
  Dino Arslanagic (Standard Liège)
  Maor Buzaglo (Standard Liège)
  Dudu Biton (Standard Liège)
  Laurent Ciman (Standard Liège)
  Ibrahima Cissé (Standard Liège)
  Réginal Goreux (Standard Liège)
  Kanu (Standard Liège)
  Jurgen Cavens (Waasland-Beveren)
  Kassim Doumbia (Waasland-Beveren)
  Dugary Ndabashinze (Waasland-Beveren)
  Jonny Rowell (Waasland-Beveren)
  Mikaël Seoudi (Waasland-Beveren)
  Gal Shish (Waasland-Beveren)
  Karel D'Haene (Zulte Waregem)
  Bruno Godeau (Zulte Waregem)
  Hernán Hinostroza (Zulte Waregem)
  Ólafur Ingi Skúlason (Zulte Waregem)
  Bryan Verboom (Zulte Waregem)

2 Own goals (2 players)

  Jelle Van Damme (Standard Liége, scored for Gent and Zulte Waregem)
  Bruno Godeau (Zulte Waregem, scored twice for Genk)

1 Own goal (15 players)

  Denis Odoi (Anderlecht, scored for Club Brugge)
  Bram Nuytinck (Anderlecht, scored for Lokeren)
  Marcin Wasilewski (Anderlecht, scored for Charleroi)
  Gregory Mertens (Cercle Brugge, scored for Mons)
  Anthony Portier (Cercle Brugge, scored for Genk)
  Danijel Milićević (Charleroi, scored for Standard Liège)
  Michael Almebäck (Club Brugge, scored for Zulte Waregem)
  Óscar Duarte (Club Brugge, scored for Standard Liège)
  Khaleem Hyland (Genk, scored for Anderlecht)
  Derrick Tshimanga (Genk, scored for OH Leuven)
  César Arzo (Gent, scored for Beerschot)
  Baptiste Martin (Kortrijk, scored for Lierse)
  Ibrahima Gueye (Lokeren, scored for Lierse)
  Mijat Marić (Lokeren, scored for Beerschot)
  Bas Sibum (Waasland-Beveren, scored for Standard Liège)

Hat-tricks

Notes

References 

Belgian Pro League seasons
Belgian
1